The 1997 UTEP Miners football team was an American football team that represented the University of Texas at El Paso in the Western Athletic Conference during the 1997 NCAA Division I-A football season. In their fifth year under head coach Charlie Bailey, the team compiled a 4–7 record.

Schedule

References

UTEP
UTEP Miners football seasons
UTEP Miners football